The Novi Sad Theatre is a small Hungarian language theatre in Serbia. It is located in the Rotkvarija neighborhood, near city centre on Jovana Subotića street 3–5, in Novi Sad, the capital of the Serbian province Vojvodina. 

The theatre was established in 1974, and its first play was Örkény István's Macskajáték, which was held on 27 January 1974. Before that time, there was only one Hungarian language theatre in Vojvodina and it was located in Subotica.

See also
 Serbian National Theatre
 Youth Theatre
 List of theatres in Serbia

References

External links
 Official site 
 Official site 
 Official site 

Culture in Novi Sad
Theatres in Novi Sad
Hungarians in Vojvodina
1974 establishments in Serbia